Pentalenene oxygenase (Formerly , PtlI) is an enzyme with systematic name pentalenene,NADPH:oxygen 13-oxidoreductase. This enzyme catalyses the following chemical reaction

 pentalenene + 2 NADPH + 2 H+ + 2 O2  pentalen-13-al + 2 NADP+ + 3 H2O (overall reaction)
(1a) pentalenene + NADPH + H+ + O2  pentalen-13-ol + NADP+ + H2O
(1b) pentalen-13-ol + NADPH + H+ + O2  pentalen-13-al + NADP+ + 2 H2O

Pentalenene oxygenase is a heme-thiolate protein (P-450).

References

External links 
 

EC 1.14.15